The Skylarks may refer to:

The Skylarks (vocal group), American singing group of the 1940s–1970s
The Skylarks (South African vocal group), singing group associated with Miriam Makeba

See also
Skylarks, 1936 film
Sky Larks, 1934 cartoon